Springport High School is located on the western edge of Jackson County in Springport, Michigan.

Notable alumni

External links
Official web site

Public high schools in Michigan
Schools in Jackson County, Michigan